Verl is a town in the district of Gütersloh in the state of North Rhine-Westphalia, Germany. It is approximately 15 km south of Bielefeld and 10 km east of Gütersloh.

In the 19th century two citizens of Verl, Johannes Otto and Ferdinand Bredeik (Bredeick), founded two towns in Ohio, USA: Delphos and Ottoville. Since the 1990s Verl has been an official sister city of both towns.

History
The name Verl was first mentioned in the expression 'Henricus de Verlo', which can be found in a charter from 1264. The designation probably relates to the farm estate Meier zu Verl, which belonged to a group of four estates that presumably came into existence around the turn of the first millennium. Some earlier documented references to estates in this area can be dated back to the year 1188.

In 1512, a chapel was built in the farming community. This chapel was turned into a parish church in 1577 and, since then, has marked the social center for the communities of Verl, Sende and Bornholte. Count Wenzel Anton von Kaunitz-Rietberg sponsored the building of the church of St. Anna at the location of the former chapel in 1792. The construction of this classical hall church was completed in 1801.

Until the establishment of the Kingdom of Westphalia in 1807 during the Napoleonic period, Verl belonged to the County of Rietberg. From 1807 on, the county was divided into two administrative districts (called cantons) -- Rietberg and Neuenkirchen—comprising the now independent municipalities of Verl, Bornholte, Sende, Liemke, and Österwiehe. After the Congress of Vienna in 1815, the districts where incorporated into the newly created district of Wiedenbrück.

On July 1, 1838, the canton administration was moved from Neuenkirchen to Verl and, in addition to the aforementioned municipalities, the village of Kaunitz was added to the newly created canton of Verl. With the introduction of a new local government code in the Kingdom of Prussia on October 31, 1841, the canton's name was changed to Amt Verl (meaning department). By this time, Verl already had 6,786 inhabitants.

Another adjustment to the local government code was carried out on January 1, 1970, constituting the current city limits. Now simply called Verl, the municipality consists of five administrative units (Verl, Bornholte, Sürenheide, Sende, and Kaunitz) and belongs to the district of Gütersloh. Verl is a town as of 1 January 2010.

Places of interest
 Catholic church St. Anna, from 1792
 Timbered houses from the 16th century
 Flea market "Hobbymarkt"—one of the largest flea markets in Germany, every first Saturday of the month

Important companies
 Beckhoff New Automation Technology
 Bertelsmann Financial Services
 Miles and More Traveler loyalty

References